Adenocline is a genus of plants, under the family Euphorbiaceae first described as a genus in 1843. It is native to southern Africa (South Africa, Zimbabwe, Malawi).

Species
 Adenocline acuta (Thunb.) Baill. - Malawi, Zimbabwe, Cape Province
 Adenocline pauciflora Turcz. - KwaZulu-Natal, Cape Province
 Adenocline violifolia (Kunze) Prain - Cape Province

Formerly included
moved to Leidesia 
A. procumbens - Leidesia procumbens

References

Adenoclineae
Flora of Southern Africa
Euphorbiaceae genera
Taxa named by Nikolai Turczaninow